Pan Atlantic  is a studio album by New York City jazz drummer Bobby Previte.

Track listing 
 "Deep Lake" 10:17 
 "Stay on Path" 5:39
 "The Eternity Clause" 8:11
 "Destruction Layer" 8:47
 "Pan Atlantic" 8:55
 "Question Mark" 7:09
 "Veltin" 8:37

Personnel 
Gianluca Petrella: trombone; 
Wolfgang Puschnig: alto sax, baritone sax; 
Benoît Delbecq: fender rhodes; 
Nils Davidsen: bass; 
Bobby Previte: drums, fender rhodes (7);

2009 albums
Bobby Previte albums